The Nations team event competition at the 2015 World Championships was held on 10 February 2015.

FIS Overall Nations Cup standings
The participating nations were seeded according to the Overall Nations Cup standings prior to the World Championships:

Argentina also participated, although as they had no points in the Nations Cup, they were seeded last.

Participating teams
Every nation submitted a team of four to six athletes, with at least two male and two female skiers.

Bracket

Results

Round of 16

Quarterfinals

Semifinals

Small Final

Big Final

References

Nations team event